I Can Only Be Me is the ninth posthumous album by Eva Cassidy, released on March 3, 2023, and is a collaboration between Blix Street Records and the London Symphony Orchestra.

Background
In an interview with The Independent, Cassidy's former bandmate and arranger Chris Biondo shared, "Eva had a fantasy of one day having a full orchestra back her up [...] to her, that was the greatest place you could be musically."

Recording
Audio restoration technology developed by filmmaker Peter Jackson was used to strip Cassidy's voice from her original recordings, with the orchestrations being produced in 2021.

William Ross, who created the album’s “Autumn Leaves” track, said:  "I can’t possibly find the words to adequately express my thoughts and feelings about Eva, one of the most unique, hypnotic, and powerful singers of all time. Her voice resonates through my whole being. I don’t understand what she does to me…but I’m stunned by the experience. Those familiar with her have been changed forever."

Chart performance
The album debuted at number 9 on the UK Official Albums Chart.

Critical reception

I Can Only Be Me received generally favourable reviews from music critics. The Music claimed that Cassidy was "one of the great singers of our generation" and, rating the album 4/5 stars, added that the release was filled with "beautiful, larger-than-life compositions, deeply rich in texture".

Track listing
Credits adapted from Spotify.

 "Songbird" 
 "Autumn Leaves"
 "People Get Ready"
 "Waly Waly"
 "Time After Time"
 "Tall Trees in Georgia"
 "Ain't No Sunshine"
 "You've Changed"
 "I Can Only Be Me"

Charts

Weekly charts

References

2023 albums
Eva Cassidy albums
Albums published posthumously